The 2019–20 FAO Women's League was the 7th edition of the FAO Women's League. SAI-STC Cuttack were the defending champions. The FAO Women's League (FWL) is organised every year by the Football Association of Odisha (FAO), the official football governing body of Odisha, India. The regular season started on 20 February 2019 and ended on 9 March 2019. Sangeeta Sharma, Joint Secretary (FAO), and Geetanjali Khuntia (Ex-Indian International) were the chief guests in the inauguration ceremony. On 30 December 2019, East Coast Railway were crowned the champions, garnering fifteen points from eight matches.

Teams
East Coast Railway
Odisha Police
Odisha Sports
Rising Student's Club
SAI-STC Cuttack

Venues

Cuttack
 Odisha Police Ground
 Ravenshaw University Ground
 Sports Hostel Ground

League stage

 Note: The winner of the league stage would qualify for the 2019–20 Indian Women's League.

References

Sports competitions in Odisha
1
2019–20 domestic women's association football leagues